The Timothy Files is a 1987 best selling work of fiction by Lawrence Sanders. It consists of linked stories featuring Timothy Cone, who works as a hard-boiled type investigator.  He is a scruffy character, rough of mouth and demeanor but pure of heart.  Cone has trouble with relationships, surviving on a rough-edged on-going affair with his supervisor, and an only slightly softer relationship with his cat Cleo.  The stories in the book deal with his successful attempts to find out the truth and put villains behind bars.

References

1987 books